Hong Tianguifu (23 November 1849 – 18 November 1864) was the second and last king of the Taiping Heavenly Kingdom. He is popularly referred to as the Junior Lord. Officially, like his father Hong Xiuquan, he was the King of Heaven. To differentiate, he is also called the Junior King of Heaven.

History
Hong succeeded his father at fourteen and was not respected like his father by the princes, and he was spoken of poorly. Li Xiucheng wrote in his autobiography, which was written shortly before Li's execution, Hong Tianguifu was described as "inexperienced", "spoiled" and "incapable". Also, Hong Tianguifu never rode a horse, which was essential for leaders and commanders in wars.

Four months after his coronation, Tianjing, the capital of the Taiping rebels, was captured by the Qing dynasty. Hong Tianguifu escaped to Dongba, Jiangsu in July 1864, rendezvoused with his uncle, Hong Rengan. After going to Guangde County, Anhui first, they went to the town of Huzhou, Zhejiang on 13 August 1864 to rendezvous with the local Taiping Army commander Huang Wenjin. The Qing dynasty sent Zuo Zongtang and Li Hongzhang to attack the city, and Chen Xueming, the Taiping army commander in charge of defending the southern gate of the town, surrendered on 26 August 1864. Hong Tianguifu, Hong Rengan and Huang Wenjin were forced to flee from the town next day, under the cover of night, and Huang Wenjin soon died of his wounds. The rest of the survivors attempted to escape to the border region of Jiangxi, Guangdong and Fujian to join the remnant Taiping forces led by Li Shixian, but on 9 October 1864, they were ambushed by the Qing army at Shicheng. Hong Rengan was captured and subsequently executed on 23 November 1864 at Nanchang, Jiangxi. Hong Tianguifu escaped to the mountains near Shicheng after his token force was wiped out, but he was caught on 25 October 1864 by Qing soldiers searching for him.

On the way to the escort, Hong Tianguifu and a Qing army soldier named Tang Jiatong had a conversation.

Hong Tianguifu first talked about his relationship with his father Hong Xiuquan and others. He said that the old things of the Taiping Heavenly Kingdom were done by his father and Hong Renxuan. "It has nothing to do with me, even after stepping on the road, I did nothing that is unfavorable to the Qing dynasty, those who resisted the Qing Empire were shattered by the king, Zhongwang and others." However, after the second day of writing a poem of praise to the Qing dynasty, he was subsequently executed by slow slicing on 18 November 1864 at the age of 14.

A glimpse of Hong Tianguifu's character can be seen by his remarks before his execution: "Guangdong is not a nice place, I do not want to go back in. I just want to study with Old Master Tang in Hunan, and I should be a great scholar, I want to be a good scholar". ("廣東地方不好，我也不愿回去了，我衹愿跟唐老爺到湖南讀書，想進秀才") This apparently innocent, pointless and irrelevant comment was considered by some as a desperate and futile attempt to avoid death by confusing the executioner of his identity. It may also have reflected his utter lack of understanding of what was happening to him, and to his lost kingdom.

Despite the short time he was a king, he was issued an official jade seal (玉璽 yù xǐ), which is an exhibit in the Hong Kong Museum of History.

Hong Tianguifu's name is unusual in that it contains a three-character given name whereas almost all Chinese given names have just one or two characters.

Bibliography
Mark Juergensmeye & Wade Clark Roof, Taiping Rebellion, in Encyclopedia of Global Religion, Volume 1, SAGE, 2012, pp. 1257.
Nick Shepley, Sun Yat Sen and the birth of modern China: 20th Century China: Volume One, AUK Academic, 2013.
James Z. Gao, Taiping Rebellion, in Historical Dictionary of Modern China (1800–1949), Scarecrow Press, 209, pp. 350–352.

Notes

References

Heavenly kings of Taiping
People from Huadu District
1849 births
1864 deaths
Executed people from Guangdong
People executed by the Qing dynasty
People executed by flaying
Hakka people
Executed Taiping Heavenly Kingdom people
Child soldiers
Executed children